The 2016–17 GlobalPort Batang Pier season was the fifth season of the franchise in the Philippine Basketball Association (PBA).

Key dates

2016

October 30: The 2016 PBA draft took place at Midtown Atrium, Robinson Place Manila.
November 25: GlobalPort Batang Pier formally appointed team consultant Franz Pumaren to be its head coach replacing Johnedel Cardel, who was then relegated as an assistant coach.

Draft picks

Special draft

Regular draft

Roster

Philippine Cup

Eliminations

Standings

Game log

|- style="background:#cfc;"
| 1
| November 25
| Mahindra
| W 97–75
| Terrence Romeo (29)
| KG Canaleta (11)
| Terrence Romeo (6)
| Smart Araneta Coliseum
| 1–0

|- style="background:#cfc;"
| 2
| December 2
| Star
| W 91–84
| Stanley Pringle (24)
| J. R. Quiñahan (10)
| Terrence Romeo (8)
| Smart Araneta Coliseum
| 2–0
|- style="background:#fcc;"
| 3
| December 7
| Alaska
| L 84–95
| Terrence Romeo (26)
| KG Canaleta (10)
| Pringle, Romeo (4)
| Mall of Asia Arena
| 2–1
|- style="background:#cfc;"
| 4
| December 11
| Barangay Ginebra
| W 91–84
| Terrence Romeo (35)
| J. R. Quiñahan (9)
| Stanley Pringle (4)
| Smart Araneta Coliseum
| 3–1
|- style="background:#fcc;"
| 5
| December 21
| Blackwater
| L 91–99
| Terrence Romeo (22)
| Canaleta, Quiñahan, Romeo (8)
| Terrence Romeo (9)
| Filoil Flying V Centre
| 3–2
|- style="background:#fcc;"
| 6
| December 28
| Phoenix
| L 99–101
| Terrence Romeo (32)
| J. R. Quiñahan (14)
| Terrence Romeo (9)
| Cuneta Astrodome
| 3–3

|- style="background:#cfc;"
| 7
| January 6
| Meralco
| W 97–89
| Terrence Romeo (27)
| Stanley Pringle (9)
| Terrence Romeo (5)
| Mall of Asia Arena
| 4–3
|- style="background:#cfc;"
| 8
| January 13
| NLEX
| W 110–96
| Terrence Romeo (32)
| Mamaril, Quiñahan (7)
| Stanley Pringle (7)
| Mall of Asia Arena
| 5–3
|- style="background:#fcc;"
| 9
| January 21
| San Miguel
| L 100–106
| Stanley Pringle (21)
| J. R. Quiñahan (11)
| Terrence Romeo (9)
| Hoops Dome
| 5–4
|- style="background:#fcc;"
| 10
| January 25
| TNT
| L 98–102
| Terrence Romeo (35)
| Pringle, Romeo (9)
| Terrence Romeo (6)
| Cuneta Astrodome
| 5–5
|- style="background:#cfc;"
| 11
| January 29
| Rain or Shine
| W 117–99
| Terrence Romeo (44)
| Yutien Andrada (8)
| Terrence Romeo (6)
| Cuneta Astrodome
| 6–5

Playoffs

Bracket

Game log

|- style="background:#fcc;"
| 1
| February 4
| TNT
| L 101–109
| Terrence Romeo (28)
| J. R. Quiñahan (6)
| Terrence Romeo (8)
| Smart Araneta Coliseum
| 0–1
|- style="background:#fcc;"
| 2
| February 6
| TNT
| L 90–95
| Terrence Romeo (22)
| Rico Maierhofer (10)
| Stanley Pringle (6)
| Smart Araneta Coliseum
| 0–2

Commissioner's Cup

Eliminations

Standings

Game log

|- style="background:#fcc;"
| 1
| March 18
| Alaska
| L 79–107
| Stanley Pringle (27)
| Sean Williams (19)
| Stanley Pringle (6)
| Cuneta Astrodome
| 0–1
|- style="background:#fcc;"
| 2
| March 25
| Star
| L 77–103
| Sean Williams (20)
| Sean Williams (14)
| Terrence Romeo (8)
| Mindanao Civic Center
| 0–2

|- style="background:#fcc;"
| 3
| April 5
| Barangay Ginebra
| L 96–113
| Stanley Pringle (29)
| Sean Williams (12)
| Terrence Romeo (7)
| Smart Araneta Coliseum
| 0–3
|- style="background:#fcc;"
| 4
| April 8
| Blackwater
| L 113–118
| Terrence Romeo (35)
| Malcolm White (17)
| Stanley Pringle (5)
| Oracle Arena
| 0–4
|- style="background:#cfc;"
| 5
| April 12
| NLEX
| W 85–82
| Malcolm White (23)
| Malcolm White (16)
| Terrence Romeo (5)
| Quicken Loans Arena
| 1–4
|- style="background:#fcc;"
| 6
| April 21
| TNT
| L 88–109
| Malcolm White (21)
| Malcolm White (16)
| Cortez, Romeo (4)
| Amway Center
| 1–5
|- style="background:#cfc;"
| 7
| April 23
| Mahindra
| W 105–86
| Stanley Pringle (24)
| Malcolm White (17)
| Stanley Pringle (5)
| Smart Araneta Coliseum
| 2–5
|- style="text-align:center;"
| colspan="9" style="background:#bbcaff;"|All-Star Break

|- style="background:#fcc;"
| 8
| May 5
| Phoenix
| L 72–84
| Stanley Pringle (25)
| Stanley Pringle (9)
| Stanley Pringle (6)
| Smart Araneta Coliseum
| 2–6
|- style="background:#cfc;"
| 9
| May 10
| Meralco
| W 94–86
| Justin Harper (30)
| Justin Harper (19)
| Stanley Pringle (8)
| Mall of Asia Arena
| 3–6
|- style="background:#cfc;"
| 10
| May 26
| Rain or Shine
| W 107–101
| Terrence Romeo (26)
| Justin Harper (10)
| Terrence Romeo (7)
| Alonte Sports Arena
| 4–6

|- style="background:#fcc;"
| 11
| June 2
| San Miguel
| L 101–112
| Justin Harper (25)
| Justin Harper (12)
| Terrence Romeo (7)
| Smart Araneta Coliseum
| 4–7

Playoffs

Bracket

Game log

|- style="background:#cfc;"
| 1
| June 4
| Alaska
| W 107–106
| Justin Harper (32)
| Justin Harper (17)
| Stanley Pringle (5)
| Mall of Asia Arena
| 1–0

|- style="background:#fcc;"
| 1
| June 6
| Barangay Ginebra
| L 85–96
| Justin Harper (29)
| Justin Harper (15)
| Stanley Pringle (3)
| Smart Araneta Coliseum
| 0–1

Governors' Cup

Eliminations

Standings

Game log

|- style="background:#fcc;"
| 1
| July 21
| Rain or Shine
| L 96–98
| Terrence Romeo (28)
| Sean Anthony (16)
| Stanley Pringle (7)
| Smart Araneta Coliseum
| 0–1
|- style="background:#cfc;"
| 2
| July 26
| Phoenix
| W 100–91
| Murphey Holloway (29)
| Murphey Holloway (26)
| Terrence Romeo (5)
| Smart Araneta Coliseum
| 1–1
|- style="background:#fcc;"
| 3
| July 30
| Barangay Ginebra
| L 108–124
| Murphey Holloway (36)
| Murphey Holloway (18)
| Terrence Romeo (9)
| Smart Araneta Coliseum
| 1–2

|- style="background:#cfc;"
| 4
| August 20
| Kia
| W 102–90
| Murphey Holloway (29)
| Murphey Holloway (18)
| Mike Cortez (6)
| Smart Araneta Coliseum
| 2–2
|- style="background:#fcc;"
| 5
| August 25
| San Miguel
| L 112–115
| Terrence Romeo (26)
| Murphey Holloway (23)
| Murphey Holloway (6)
| Smart Araneta Coliseum
| 2–3

|- style="background:#cfc;"
| 6
| September 1
| TNT
| W 119–112
| Stanley Pringle (30)
| Murphey Holloway (17)
| Murphey Holloway (6)
| Ynares Center
| 3–3
|- style="background:#fcc;"
| 7
| September 3
| NLEX
| L 99–109
| Murphey Holloway (29)
| Murphey Holloway (17)
| Murphey Holloway (6)
| Smart Araneta Coliseum
| 3–4
|- style="background:#fcc;"
| 8
| September 8
| Alaska
| L 88–101
| Murphey Holloway (25)
| Anthony, Holloway (9)
| Baracael, Romeo (4)
| Mall of Asia Arena
| 3–5
|- style="background:#fcc;"
| 9
| September 15
| Star
| L 83–109
| Murphey Holloway (20)
| Murphey Holloway (17)
| Terrence Romeo (8)
| Smart Araneta Coliseum
| 3–6
|- style="background:#fcc;" 
| 10
| September 17
| Blackwater
| L 107–118
| Murphey Holloway (28)
| Murphey Holloway (23)
| Sean Anthony (6)
| Ynares Center 
| 3–7
|- style="background:#fcc;" 
| 11
| September 22
| Meralco
| L 93–100
| Sean Anthony (23)
| Sean Anthony (13)
| Grey, Pringle (3)
| Mall of Asia Arena 
| 3–8

Transactions

Trades

Pre-season

Commissioner's Cup

Rookie signings

Free agency

Additions

Recruited imports

Awards

References

NorthPort Batang Pier seasons
GlobalPort Batang Pier season